Eden may refer to:

Garden of Eden, the "garden of God" described in the Book of Genesis

Places and jurisdictions

Canada 
 Eden, Ontario
 Eden High School

Middle East 
 Eden, Lebanon, a city and former bishopric
 Camp Eden, Iraq

Oceania 
 Eden (New Zealand electorate), a former New Zealand Parliamentary electorate
 Eden, New South Wales, Australia
 Electoral district of Eden, an electoral district in New South Wales

United Kingdom 
 Eden, County Antrim, a townland in Northern Ireland
Eden, the names of three townlands in County Londonderry, Northern Ireland: 
Eden, Dungiven parish
Eden, Learmount parish (County Londonderry portion)
Eden, Tamlaght O'Crilly parish
 Eden, a townland in County Tyrone, Northern Ireland 
 Eden, High Wycombe, a shopping centre in Buckinghamshire, England
 Eden District, Cumbria, England
 Eden Project, a visitor attraction in Cornwall, England
 Eden Water, a tributary of the River Tweed, Scotland
 River Eden, Kent, a tributary of the River Medway, England
 River Eden, Cumbria, England

United States 
 Eden, Arizona
 Eden, Idaho
 Eden, Peoria County, Illinois
 Eden, Randolph County, Illinois
 Eden, Indiana
 Eden, Kansas
 Eden, Kentucky
 Eden (Gardner, Louisiana), a historic place
 Eden, Maryland
 Eden, Minnesota
 Eden, Mississippi
 Eden, New York, a town
 Eden (CDP), New York, a census-designated place within the town
 Eden, North Carolina
 Eden, South Dakota
 Eden, Texas
 Eden, Utah
 Eden, Vermont
 Eden, Washington
 Eden, Wisconsin
 Eden, Wyoming

Elsewhere 
 Eden Rocks, Antarctica
 Eden District Municipality, South Africa
 Garden Route, Eden District located in the Western Cape, South Africa

Multiple entries 
 Mount Eden (disambiguation)
 River Eden (disambiguation)
 Eden, West Virginia (disambiguation)
 Eden, Wisconsin (disambiguation)
 Eden Township (disambiguation)

People 
 Eden (musician) (born 1995), Irish singer-songwriter and music producer
 Eden (name), including a list of people with the name Eden
 Eden xo (born 1989), American pop singer-songwriter
 Fiona Russell Powell, stage name Eden, member of the 1980s pop group ABC

Arts, entertainment, and media

Fictional entities 
 Eden (Aladdin), in Disney's Aladdin films
 Eden Lord, in the television series Nip/Tuck
 Eden Worlds, fictional planets in Dimension X in the Teenage Mutant Ninja Turtles franchise
 Martin Eden, in the novel Martin Eden by Jack London

Films 
 Eden (2006 film), German romance
 Eden (2012 film), a U.S. human trafficking drama by Megan Griffiths
 Eden (2014 film), French drama by Mia Hansen-Løve
 Eden (2015 film), a U.S. survival drama

Publications 
 Eden (Fox novel), a 2014 novel by Candice Fox
 Eden (Lem novel), a 1959 science fiction book by Stanisław Lem
 Eden, a 2007 Sandra Mahoney novel by Dorothy Johnston
 Eden: It's an Endless World!, a 1998 manga by Hiroki Endo
 EDEN (magazine), an online manga magazine
 Eden (newspaper), an English-language newspaper in Cameroon

Music

Performers 
 Eden (Australian band), a dark wave band
 Eden (Israeli band), a vocal group
 Eden (South African band), a boy band
 Eden (musician), an Irish electronic artist
 Eden Alene, Israeli singer known mononymously as Eden

Albums 
 Eden (Cupcakke album), 2018
 Eden (Everything but the Girl album), 1984
 Eden (Faun album), 2011
 Eden (Luna Sea album), 1993
 Eden (Sarah Brightman album), 1998
 Eden, by Akino Arai, 2004
 Eden, by Étienne Daho, 1996
 Eden, by Vektroid recording as New Dreams Ltd., 2016

Songs 
 "Eden" (Hooverphonic song), 1998; covered by Sarah Brightman, 1998
 "Eden" (Nana Mizuki song), 2015
 "Eden", by Iron & Wine from Archive Series Volume No. 1, 2015
 "Eden", by Phil Wickham from Heaven & Earth, 2009
 "Eden", by Talk Talk from Spirit of Eden, 1988
 "Eden", by Tesseract from One, 2011

Other uses in music 
 Eden Electronics, a bass amplification company
 Eden Festival, a Scottish music festival
 Eden Studios, a recording studio

Television 
 Eden (British TV channel), UK and Ireland
 Eden (New Zealand TV channel), New Zealand
 Eden TV, Italy
 Eden (1993 TV series), with Barbara Alyn Woods
 Eden (2002 TV series), a British reality series
 Eden (2016 TV series), a British reality series
 Eden (2021 TV series), a Netflix original anime series
 Eden (Australian TV series), a 2021 drama series on Stan

Other uses in media 
 Eden (Eugene O'Brien play), 2001
 Eden (Steve Carter play), 1976
 Eden*, a 2009 visual novel by Minori

Brands, enterprises, and organizations 
 Eden (cheese), a Philippines cheese brand
 Eden Foods Inc., an independent organic food producer in the United States
 Eden Games, a video game developer
 Eden Studios, a recording studio
 Eden Theological Seminary, a Missouri-based seminary
 Education Data Exchange Network, a system of information transfer among US educational agencies
 European Destinations of Excellence, a European organization promoting tourism
 European Distance and E-learning Network, the international educational organization

Science and technology 
 Eden growth model, a bacterial growth concept
 MBDB, street name Eden, a psychedelic drug
 VIA Eden, a computer processor family

Ships
 Eden (1826 ship), a UK merchant ship

Sports 
 Eden AFC, a New Zealand association football club, 1947–1997, subsumed by Three Kings United
 Eden Gardens, a sports stadium in Kolkata, India
 Eden Park, a sports stadium in Auckland, New Zealand
 Eden Arena, a sports stadium in Prague-Vršovice, Czech Republic

See also 
 Aden (disambiguation)
 East of Eden (disambiguation)
 Eden Valley (disambiguation)
 Garden of Eden (disambiguation)
 EDUN, a brand of clothing